Zalu Ab or Zaluab may refer to:
 Zalu Ab, Ilam
 Zalu Ab, Kermanshah
 Zalu Ab Rural District, in Kermanshah Province

See also
 Ab Zalu (disambiguation)